Dorotea "Doris" Budimir (born 16 April 1961) is a Croatian singer-songwriter who has represented Yugoslavia in the Eurovision Song Contest 1986 with the song "Željo moja", finishing 11th with 49 points, and Croatia in the Eurovision Song Contest 1999 with the song "Marija Magdalena", finishing fourth with 118 points.

Career 
Dorotea Dragović was born in Split, Croatia, then part of Yugoslavia, and had an interest in singing since her childhood. She cites Arsen Dedić, Gabi Novak and Tereza Kesovija as her biggest influences and childhood idols. She came to regional prominence in the early 1980s as a member of musical group More, and began her solo career in 1986. The same year, she represented Yugoslavia in the Eurovision Song Contest 1986 in Bergen with the song "Željo moja", and finished the 11th with 49 points. Dragović has since been one of the most famous pop singers in Yugoslavia, later Croatia and its region.

In 1999 Dragović was chosen to represent Croatia in the Eurovision Song Contest 1999, after she won national election HRT Dora with her dramatic song "Marija Magdalena", written by prominent Croatian songwriter Tonči Huljić. Dragović placed a respectable fourth in Jerusalem, despite having been drawn early in the singing order, sometimes cited as a disadvantage. Her performance also included the removal of some of her clothing – seen jocularly as a staple of Eurovision performances – and was well received in the first contest in which most countries allocated their points after a public telephone vote. This remains one of Croatia's best results at the contest. "Marija Magdalena" was also a radio hit on Greek radio station FLY FM 89,7 and reached number one on its airplay.

Personal life 
Dragović was known in the early 1980s for her work with bands from Split. One of her best known singles "Hajde da se mazimo" was one of the most interesting pop songs of the decade called the "golden eighties". She is a known supporter of Torcida, fans of Hajduk Split football club. In 2001 Dragović was threatened by Torcida supporters as she sang to Montenegrin Prime Minister Milo Đukanović at the 2000 New Year's Eve.

Since 1990, Dragović is married to a former water polo player, Mario Budimir, with whom she has a son named Borna (b. 1990).

Discography

Studio albums 
 1985 — Tigrica
 1986 — Željo moja
 1987 — Tužna je noć
 1987 — Tvoja u duši
 1988 — Pjevaj srce moje
 1989 — Budi se dan
 1992 — Dajem ti srce
 1993 — Ispuni mi zadnju želju
 1995 — Baklje Ivanjske
 1996 — Rođendan u Zagrebu
 1997 — Živim po svom
 1999 — Krajem vijeka
 2000 — Lice
 2002 — Malo mi za sriću triba
 2009 — Ja vjerujem
 2014 — Koncert u Lisinskom

Compilation albums 
 1990 — Najveći hitovi
 1998 — Sve želje moje
 2001 — 20 godina s ljubavlju
 2007 — The Platinum Collection
 2010 — Najljepše ljubavne pjesme - Doris Dragović
 2014 — The Best Of Collection

Singles

See also 
 Croatia in the Eurovision Song Contest
 Yugoslavia in the Eurovision Song Contest
 Zadarfest

References

External links 
 Discography of Doris Dragović
 Review of Ja vjerujem (English)

1961 births
Living people
Musicians from Split, Croatia
Eurovision Song Contest entrants for Croatia
21st-century Croatian women singers
Croatian pop singers
Eurovision Song Contest entrants of 1986
Eurovision Song Contest entrants of 1999
Yugoslav women singers
Eurovision Song Contest entrants for Yugoslavia
20th-century Croatian women singers
Croatian-language singers